The Carlton was a golf tournament on the LPGA Tour played in 1976 and 1978. It was played at the Calabasas Country Club in Calabasas, California.

Winners
Golden Lights Championship
1978 Jane Blalock

The Carlton
1976 Donna Caponi

See also
Golden Lights Championship, another LPGA Tour event, played from 1978 to 1981, in New York and Connecticut

References

External links
Calabasas Country Club

Former LPGA Tour events
Golf in California
Sports competitions in Los Angeles County, California
Calabasas, California
1976 establishments in California
1978 disestablishments in California
Women's sports in California